Amen Corner is a street located off Ave Maria Lane, just to the west of St. Paul's Cathedral and between the Old Bailey and Paternoster Square, in the City of London.

On the feastday of Corpus Christi, monks would say prayers in a procession to St. Paul's Cathedral. They set off from Paternoster Row chanting the Lord's Prayer (Pater noster... being the opening line in Latin). They would reach the final 'amen' as they turned the corner in Ave Maria Lane, after which they would chant Hail Mary (Ave Maria in Latin).

The area was notable as the site of the Royal College of Physicians until it was destroyed by the Great Fire of London in 1666.

The modern Amen Corner is a stub of road that leads to Amen Court, home to a short terrace of 17th-century houses where the canons of the cathedral once lived (and still do).

The first meeting of the Campaign for Nuclear Disarmament was held in 1958 at the home of founder John Collins. Present at the occasion also were the Labour Party politicians Michael Foot and Denis Healey.

There is another Amen Corner, in Tooting, south London, where the A217 road (Mitcham Road) meets Rectory Lane and Southcroft Road.

See also
 Amen House

References

Streets in the City of London
Odonyms referring to religion